The Association of Jesuit Colleges and Universities in Asia Pacific (AJCU-AP) is an association of 22 Jesuit higher educational institutions on the territory of the Jesuit Conference of Asia Pacific.

Members
Current list of members, as of 2019:
 Ateneo de Davao University
 Ateneo de Manila University
 Loyola School of Theology
 Ateneo de Naga University
 Ateneo de Zamboanga University
 Xavier University – Ateneo de Cagayan
 Loyola College of Culion
 Sanata Dharma University
 Polytechnic ATMI Surakarta
 Elisabeth University of Music
 Sophia University
 Sogang University
 Fu Jen Catholic University
 St. Robert Bellarmine Faculty of Theology
 Newman College, University of Melbourne
 Jesuit College of Spirituality
 Myanmar Leadership Center
 Instituto São João de Brito
 Xavier Learning Community
 Ricci Hall, University of Hong Kong

References

External links

Jesuit universities and colleges
International college and university associations and consortia